Aaron Jordan Bramlett (born January 10, 1977) is an American former professional basketball player.

Bramlett was a three-year letterman at La Cueva High School in Albuquerque, New Mexico, leading the Bears to a state championship in 1994. He committed to the University of Arizona in 1995 and played for the Wildcats for four years, rising to sixth on the school's career list for rebounding and 25th in scoring. He helped Arizona win the NCAA Men's Division I Basketball Championship in 1997, as well as reach the Sweet Sixteen in 1996, and the Elite Eight in 1998.

In 1999, Bramlett was taken by the Cleveland Cavaliers in the second round of the 1999 NBA Draft. Bramlett played only eight games with Cleveland, and was waived in January 2000. He also saw action in 35 CBA contests during the 1999-2000 season, playing for the La Crosse Bobcats.

He joined Grupo Capitol Valladolid in the Spanish Liga ACB for the 2000-01 campaign, and in 2001 moved to Caprabo Lleida (now Plus Pujol Lleida). Until 2006, he appeared in a total of 185 ACB games, most of them representing Lleida. In 2007, he captured the Latvian national championship with ASK Riga and received 2006-07 All-Latvijas Basketbola līga Center of the Year honors (by eurobasket.com).

After his playing career, Bramlett stayed close to the game, working in youth basketball and for a company which holds the marketing rights for the New Mexico Activities Association and the University of New Mexico Lobos.

References

External links
Lleida Basquet
ACB.com Profile

1977 births
Living people
American expatriate basketball people in Greece
American expatriate basketball people in Latvia
American expatriate basketball people in Spain
American men's basketball players
Arizona Wildcats men's basketball players
ASK Riga players
Basketball players from Illinois
Basketball players from Albuquerque, New Mexico
Real Betis Baloncesto players
CB Valladolid players
Centers (basketball)
Cleveland Cavaliers draft picks
Cleveland Cavaliers players
Dafnis B.C. players
Liga ACB players
People from DeKalb, Illinois
Power forwards (basketball)